The Ministry of Jean-Baptiste de Martignac was formed on 4 January 1828 after the dismissal of the Ministry of Joseph de Villèle by King Charles X of France.
The ministry was replaced on 8 August 1829 by the Ministry of Jules de Polignac.

Ministers
The ministers were:

Changes
On 3 March 1828:

On 14 May 1829:

References

Sources

French governments
1828 establishments in France
1829 disestablishments in France
Cabinets established in 1828
Cabinets disestablished in 1829